Erythemis peruviana, also known by its common name flame-tailed pondhawk, is a species from the genus Erythemis. This species was first described and named by Jules Pierre Rambur.

References

Taxa named by Jules Pierre Rambur
Libellulidae